Hypobapta xenomorpha is a moth of the family Geometridae first described by Oswald Bertram Lower in 1915. It is found in Australia.

References

Moths described in 1915
Pseudoterpnini